The Battle of Gurun was a minor engagement between the Japanese and Commonwealth forces during the Malayan Campaign of the Second World War. The battle occurred when the 11th Indian Division attempted to slow down the Japanese advance after the disastrous Battle of Jitra at a position 3 miles north of the village of Gurun.

Background 
General Percival gave permission to Major-General Murray-Lyon to withdraw from the Jitra position after just a few days of fighting. Murray-Lyon believed he was under attack from far greater forces than he actually was and also believed that his line of retreat was threatened by the failure of Krohcol to stop the Japanese advance from Patani. The terrain at Gurun offered a natural defensive obstacle for the British to use in the hope of stopping the Japanese advance.

The retreat from Jitra, though, was a disorganised shambles that cost the division more casualties than they had incurred during the Battle of Jitra itself. Many units were left behind at Jitra when the order to withdraw did not reach them, but many more men and whole platoons and companies were lost trying to cross the Bata River and in the broken terrain south of Jitra. Some of these men would eventually make it back to British lines, many more were captured or killed.

References 

 
 
 
 

Conflicts in 1941
World War II operations and battles of the Southeast Asia Theatre
Gurun
Gurun
Gurun
Military history of Malaya during World War II
December 1941 events